Ophichthus longicorpus is an eel in the family Ophichthidae (worm/snake eels). It is found in Lương Sơn, Nha Trang, Vietnam.

The name means longus = long; corpus = body, referring to its long trunk (4.1‒4.9 times HL).

References

longicorpus
Fish of Vietnam
Taxa named by Vn Quang Vo
Taxa named by Hans Hsuan-Ching Ho
Fish described in 2021